Bolara or Bolar is an inner city locality in Mangalore City, Karnataka, India.

The famous Mangaladevi Temple by which Mangalore derives its name and Halekote Sri Mariyamma - Mahishamardini Devasthana are located in Bolara (or Bolar as pronounced in English). Bolara is predominantly a residential area.

Religious places
Mangaladevi Temple
Mariyamma Temple
Kanti Church
Mukhyaprana Temple (Lord Hanuman)
Kallurti Sthana
Dhoomavathi Temple
Ulal Darga
Saidina Bibi Darga
Kajore Darga
Shanoor Darga
Khudrat Sha Waliulla Darga - Caste Street
Jalal Mastan Darga Formed in 629

Educational institutions
Infant Jesus Joyland School
Government Higher Primary School
Urdu School
Mission School (Kanti Church campus)
Joyland High School
Joyland Institute of Commerce
Janatha Kendra

Other notable places
Ramakrishna Ashram: This is one of the ashrams set up by the Ramakrishna Mission started by Swami Vivekananda. It has a large campus with hostels for poor families who come to Mangalore for studies.
Mulihithlu Nethravati River Bank : With a panoramic view of Ullala on the other side of the river and the railway bridge across the Nethravati river, this is a popular evening spot for locals.
Tile factories: Only two of the former six roof tile factories remain. Others have closed due to losses or union related problems.
Ice Factories: Many ice factories manufacture ice used for fishing boats.
Bolar Sea Face:

External links
Mangalore City Corporation Website
Maps Link

Localities in Mangalore